Spirit(s) may refer to:

Liquor and other volatile liquids 
 Spirits, a.k.a. liquor, distilled alcoholic drinks
 Spirit or tincture, an extract of plant or animal material dissolved in ethanol
 Volatile (especially flammable) liquids, such as
 Ethanol, also known as drinking alcohol
 Gasoline (or petrol), a clear petroleum-derived flammable liquid that is used primarily as a fuel
 Petroleum ether, liquid hydrocarbon mixtures used chiefly as non-polar solvents
 White spirit or mineral spirits, a common organic solvent used in painting and decorating

Spirituality and mood 
 Spirituality, pertaining to the soul or spirit
Spirit (vital essence), the non-corporeal essence of a being or entity
Vitalism, a belief in some fundamental, non-physical essence which differentiates organisms from inanimate, material objects
Pneuma, an ancient Greek word for 'breath' or 'wind', but also 'spirit' or 'soul'
 Soul, the spiritual part of a living being, often regarded as immortal
Mind-body dualism, the view that mind and body are distinct and separable
Geist, a German word corresponding to ghost, spirit, mind or intellect
Psyche (psychology), a Greek word for 'soul' or 'spirit' and used in psychology
Genius (mythology), a Latin word for a divine spirit present in every individual person, place, or thing
 Spirit, a supernatural and incorporeal or immaterial being 
Spirit world (Spiritualism), the world or realm inhabited by spirits
Ghost, the soul or spirit of a deceased person or animal that can appear to the living
Deity, a being considered divine or sacred
Angel, a spiritual being
Demon, an evil spirit
Tutelary deity, a guardian spirit
Jinn, a morally ambivalent invisible entity, partly physical in nature.
A being in a vision
 Spirit, nature or conception of a deity or their influence
 Holy Spirit, a divine force, manifestation of God in the Holy Trinity, or agent of divine action, according to Abrahamic Religions 
 Pneumatology, the study of the Holy Spirit in Christian theology
 Great Spirit, conception of a supreme being prevalent among some Native American and First Nations cultures
 Spirit, a mood, usually in reference to a good mood or optimism ("high spirits")
Enthusiasm
 Spirit, a feeling of social cohesiveness and mutual support, such as:
 School spirit, a sense of a supportive community at an educational institution
 Team spirit, such as that encouraged by team building activities

Companies and brands 
 SPIRIT Consortium, a group of vendors and users of electronic design automation tools
 Spirit (Belgium), a name for the Social Liberal Party, a Flemish left-liberal political party
 Spirit Airlines, an American ultra-low-cost carrier
 Spirit of Atlanta Drum and Bugle Corps, based in Atlanta, Georgia
 Spirit DataCine, a device for digitization of motion picture film
 Spirit DSP, a company that develops software for voice and video communication
 Spirit Petroleum, an American brand created by the Petroleum Marketers Oil Corporation
 Spirit Pub Company, in the United Kingdom based in Burton upon Trent
 Spirit (Sirius), a Contemporary Christian music radio station

Film and television 
 Spirit: Stallion of the Cimarron, a 2002 animated film
 The Spirit, a 2008 film based on the Eisner comic
 Spirit, a 2012 Malayalam satirical comedy film
 Spirits, a 2004 Philippine fantasy series
 "Spirits" (Stargate SG-1), a television episode
 Spirit (G.I. Joe), a fictional character
 Spirit (She-Ra), a fictional character
 Spirit, a character from the Ōban Star-Racers animated television series

Music

Bands
 Spirit (band), an American 1960s and 1970s rock band
 Spirits (band), a 1995 male/female dance music duo from England

Albums
 Spirits (Albert Ayler album), 1966
 Spirit (Spirit album), 1968
 Spirits (Lee Konitz album), 1971
 Spirit (John Denver album), 1976
 Spirit (Earth, Wind & Fire album), 1976
 Spirit (Malachi Thompson album), 1983
 Spirits (Keith Jarrett album), 1985
 The Spirit (album), 1991
 Spirits (Gil Scott-Heron album), 1994
 Spirit, a 1995 album by Caroline Lavelle
 Spirit (Sean Maguire album), 1996
 Spirit (Willie Nelson album), 1996
 Spirits (Misato Watanabe album), 1996
 Spirit (Jewel album), 1998
 Spirits (Pharoah Sanders album), 2000
 Spirit, a 2006 album by Apse
 Spirit (Eluveitie album), 2006
 Spirit (J-Rocks album), 2007
 Spirit (Leona Lewis album), 2007
 Spirit (Preston Reed album), 2007
 Spirit (This Condition album), 2010
 Spirit (Hitomi album), 2011
 Spirit (Reckless Love album), 2013
 Spirit (Amos Lee album), 2016
 Spirit (Depeche Mode album), 2017
 Spirits (Nothing More album), 2022

Songs
 "Spirit" by War from The Black-Man's Burdon, 1970
 "Spirit" by Van Morrison from Common One, 1980
 "Spirit" (Bauhaus song), 1982
 "Spirit" by Faith No More from Introduce Yourself, 1987
 "Spirit" by Phuture, 1994
 "Spirits" (Meja song), 2000
 "Spirit" by Ghost from Meliora, 2015
 "Spirits" (The Strumbellas song), 2015
 "Spirit" by J Hus, 2017
 "Spirit" (Kwesta song), 2017
 "Spirit!!" by Band-Maid from World Domination, 2018
 "Spirit" (Beyoncé song), 2019

Places
 Spirit (community), Wisconsin, an unincorporated US community
 Spirit, Wisconsin, a US town

Sports 
 Spirit (League of Legends player) (born 1996), South Korean esports player 
 Spirit Racing, a 1980s auto racing team

Vehicles 
 Advanced Soaring Concepts Spirit, a single-seat glider
 AMC Spirit, a subcompact automobile built from 1979 to 1983
 B-2 Spirit, a US Air Force stealth bomber
 Dodge Spirit, a mid-size car built from 1989 to 1995
 Spirit-class cruise ship, operated by Carnival Cruise Line and Costa Cruises
 Spirit (rover) (MER-A), one of two rovers in NASA's Mars Exploration Rover Mission
 World Aircraft Spirit, a Colombian/American light-sport aircraft

Other uses
 Spirit (building), a skyscraper on the Gold Coast in Queensland, Australia
 Spirit (comics character), title character of the comic strip The Spirit by Will Eisner
 Spirit (media personality) (born 1975), American television and radio personality
 Spirit (sculpture), a statue depicting John Denver by Sue DiCicco in Colorado, US
 Spirit: A Magazine of Poetry, a 20th-century poetry magazine published by the Catholic Poetry Society of America
 The Spirit (statue), a statue of Michael Jordan outside Chicago's United Center
 Spirit Parser Framework, an object-oriented parser-generator framework
 37452 Spirit, an asteroid named after the Mars rover
 Spirit, an item introduced in Super Smash Bros. Ultimate

See also 
 Free spirit (disambiguation)
 Spirited, a 2010 Australian TV drama series
 Spirited (film), an American Christmas musical film
 Spiritual (disambiguation)
 Spiritus (disambiguation)